Bellinzona railway station serves the town of Bellinzona, in the canton of Ticino, Switzerland. It is on the Swiss Federal Railways' Gotthard line. The station is nicknamed Porta del Ticino ("Gate of Ticino") since the opening of the Gotthard Base Tunnel in 2016.

History
The station was opened in 1874, as part of the opening of the Ticino valley railway, with its Biasca – Bellinzona – Lugano – Chiasso line, and its Bellinzona – Locarno line.  In 1882, upon the opening of the Gotthard Rail Tunnel, and the related commencement of services on the line from Airolo to Biasca, Bellinzona was connected with the north, and with German-speaking Switzerland.

In 2008, the SBB Cargo facility at Bellinzona hit the headlines, when its workers went on strike, after SBB Cargo had prescribed rigorous reduction measures for the site.

With the opening of the Gotthard Base Tunnel in 2016, travel times from Lucerne to Bellinzona fell by 45 minutes. The opening of the Ceneri Base Tunnel in December 2020 reduced travel times from Bellinzona to Lugano by 15 minutes.

Facilities
The station has five through platform tracks, served by a side platform and two island platforms, connected by both a pedestrian subway and a footbridge. There are also transit and overtaking tracks for goods trains.

The station building is on the side platform, and is flanked at each end of the station by two terminal platform tracks; the terminal track to the south is in occasional use by terminating passenger trains, but the one to the north is normally used to stable the Bellinzona tunnel rescue train.

Services
Passenger traffic at the station is handled by the Südostbahn and Swiss Federal Railways, which serve the station with long-distance trains, and by Treni Regionali Ticino Lombardia (TiLo), which operates various local and regional trains.

 the following services stop at Bellinzona:

 Gotthard Panorama Express: daily tourist oriented service via the original high level Gotthard tunnel, with connecting boat service on Lake Lucerne to Lucerne.

Regional bus routes of the Autopostale terminate on the station forecourt, providing links to various destinations. Autopostale also operates Bellinzona's city bus network, and all city services call at the station.

See also

NRLA
Bellinzona railway workers strike of 2008
Gotthardbahn

Notes

References

External links 

 
 Interactive station plan (Bellinzona)

Railway stations in Switzerland opened in 1874
Railway stations in Ticino
Bellinzona
Swiss Federal Railways stations
Neoclassical architecture in Switzerland